Qaleh-ye Kohneh-ye Kavar (also Romanized as Qal‘eh-ye Kohneh-ye Kavār) is a village in Kavar Rural District, in the Central District of Kavar County, Fars Province, Iran. At the 2006 census, its population was 564, in 124 families.

References 

Populated places in Kavar County